Hickory Grove Township may refer to the following townships in the United States:

 Hickory Grove Township, Benton County, Indiana
 Hickory Grove Township, Jasper County, Iowa
 Hickory Grove Township, Scott County, Iowa
 Hickory Grove Township, Warren County, Missouri